Diphenhydramine (DPH) is an antihistamine and sedative mainly used to treat allergies, insomnia, and symptoms of the common cold. It is also less commonly used for tremor in parkinsonism, and nausea. It is taken by mouth, injected into a vein, injected into a muscle, or applied to the skin. Maximal effect is typically around two hours after a dose, and effects can last for up to seven hours.

Common side effects include sleepiness, poor coordination and an upset stomach. Its use is not recommended in young children or the elderly. There is no clear risk of harm when used during pregnancy; however, use during breastfeeding is not recommended. It is a first generation H1-antihistamine and ethanolamine and works by blocking certain effects of histamine, which produces its antihistamine and sedative effects. Diphenhydramine is also a potent anticholinergic, which means it also works as a deliriant at higher than recommended doses as a result. Its sedative and deliriant effects have led to some cases of recreational use and addiction.

Diphenhydramine was first made by George Rieveschl and came into commercial use in 1946. It is available as a generic medication. It is sold under the brand name Benadryl, among others. In 2020, it was the 192nd most commonly prescribed medication in the United States, with more than 2million prescriptions.

Medical uses 

Diphenhydramine is a first-generation antihistamine used to treat a number of conditions including allergic symptoms and itchiness, the common cold, insomnia, motion sickness, and extrapyramidal symptoms. Diphenhydramine also has local anesthetic properties, and has been used as such in people allergic to common local anesthetics such as lidocaine.

Allergies
Diphenhydramine is effective in treatment of allergies. , it was the most commonly used antihistamine for acute allergic reactions in the emergency department.

By injection it is often used in addition to epinephrine for anaphylaxis, although  its use for this purpose had not been properly studied. Its use is only recommended once acute symptoms have improved.

Topical formulations of diphenhydramine are available, including creams, lotions, gels, and sprays. These are used to relieve itching and have the advantage of causing fewer systemic effects (e.g., drowsiness) than oral forms.

Movement disorders
Diphenhydramine is used to treat akathisia and Parkinson's disease–like extrapyramidal symptoms caused by antipsychotics. It is also used to treat acute dystonia including torticollis and oculogyric crisis caused by first generation antipsychotics.

Sleep
Because of its sedative properties, diphenhydramine is widely used in nonprescription sleep aids for insomnia. The drug is an ingredient in several products sold as sleep aids, either alone or in combination with other ingredients such as acetaminophen (paracetamol) in Tylenol PM or ibuprofen in Advil PM. Diphenhydramine can cause minor psychological dependence. Diphenhydramine has also been used as an anxiolytic.

Diphenhydramine has also been used off prescription by parents in an attempt to make their children sleep or remain sedated on long-distance flights. This has been met with criticism, both by doctors and members of the airline industry, as sedating young passengers may put them at risk if the flight encounters an emergency and they are unable to react to the situation efficiently, and the drug's side effects, especially the chance of a paradoxical reaction, may result in some individuals becoming hyperactive rather than sedated. The ethics of this use have also been challenged, with the Seattle Children's hospital arguing in a 2009 article that "Using a medication for your convenience is never an indication for medication in a child."

The American Academy of Sleep Medicine's 2017 clinical practice guidelines recommended against the use of diphenhydramine in the treatment of insomnia due to poor effectiveness and low quality of evidence. A major systematic review and network meta-analysis of medications for the treatment of insomnia published in 2022 found little evidence to inform the use of diphenhydramine for insomnia.

Nausea
Diphenhydramine also has antiemetic properties, which make it useful in treating the nausea that occurs in vertigo and motion sickness. However, when taken above recommended doses, it can cause nausea (especially above 200 mg).

Special populations 
Diphenhydramine is not recommended for people older than 60 or children under the age of six, unless a physician is consulted. These populations should be treated with second-generation antihistamines such as loratadine, desloratadine, fexofenadine, cetirizine, levocetirizine, and azelastine. Due to its strong anticholinergic effects, diphenhydramine is on the Beers list of drugs to avoid in the elderly.

Diphenhydramine is category B in the FDA Classification of Drug Safety During Pregnancy. It is also excreted in breast milk. It is expected that low doses of diphenhydramine taken occasionally will not cause any adverse effects on breastfed infants. Large doses or long-term use may affect the baby or reduce breast milk supply, especially when combined with sympathomimetic drugs such as pseudoephedrine or before the establishment of lactation. A single bedtime dose after the last feeding of the day may minimize any harmful effects of the medication on the baby and on the milk supply. Still, non-sedating antihistamines are the preferred alternative.

Paradoxical reactions to diphenhydramine have been documented, in particular among children, and it may cause excitation instead of sedation.

Topical diphenhydramine is sometimes used especially for people in hospice. This use is without indication and topical diphenhydramine should not be used as treatment for nausea because research does not indicate this therapy is more effective than alternatives.

There were no documented cases of clinically apparent acute liver injury caused by normal doses of diphenhydramine.

Adverse effects 
The most prominent side effect is sedation. A typical dose creates driving impairment equivalent to a blood-alcohol level of 0.10, which is higher than the 0.08 limit of most drunk-driving laws.

Diphenhydramine is a potent anticholinergic agent and potential deliriant in higher doses. This activity is responsible for the side effects of dry mouth and throat, increased heart rate, pupil dilation, urinary retention, constipation, and, at high doses, hallucinations or delirium. Other side effects include motor impairment (ataxia), flushed skin, blurred vision at nearpoint owing to lack of accommodation (cycloplegia), abnormal sensitivity to bright light (photophobia), sedation, difficulty concentrating, short-term memory loss, visual disturbances, irregular breathing, dizziness, irritability, itchy skin, confusion, increased body temperature (in general, in the hands and/or feet), temporary erectile dysfunction, and excitability, and although it can be used to treat nausea, higher doses may cause vomiting. Diphenhydramine in overdose may occasionally result in QT prolongation.

Some individuals experience an allergic reaction to diphenhydramine in the form of hives.

Conditions such as restlessness or akathisia can worsen from increased levels of diphenhydramine, especially with recreational dosages. Normal doses of diphenhydramine, like other first generation antihistamines, can also make symptoms of restless legs syndrome worse. 
As diphenhydramine is extensively metabolized by the liver, caution should be exercised when giving the drug to individuals with hepatic impairment.

Anticholinergic use later in life is associated with an increased risk for cognitive decline and dementia among older people.

Contraindications 
Diphenhydramine is contraindicated in premature infants and neonates as well as people who are breastfeeding. It is a pregnancy Category B drug. Diphenhydramine has additive effects with alcohol and other CNS depressants. Monoamine Oxidase inhibitors prolong and intensify the anticholinergic effect of antihistamines.

Overdose
Diphenhydramine is one of the most commonly misused over-the-counter drugs in the United States. In cases of extreme overdose, if not treated in time, acute diphenhydramine poisoning may have serious and potentially fatal consequences. Overdose symptoms may include:

 Euphoria or dysphoria
 Hallucinations (auditory, visual, tactile, etc.)
 Heart palpitations
 Extreme drowsiness
 Severe dizziness
 Abnormal speech (inaudibility, forced speech, etc.)
 Flushed skin
 Severe mouth and throat dryness
 Tremors
 Seizures
 Muscle spasms
 Inability to urinate
 Vomiting
 Acute megacolon
 Motor disturbances
 Anxiety/nervousness
 Disorientation
 Disassociation
 Abdominal pain
 Delirium
 Coma
 Death

Acute poisoning can be fatal, leading to cardiovascular collapse and death in 2–18 hours, and in general is treated using a symptomatic and supportive approach. Diagnosis of toxicity is based on history and clinical presentation, and in general specific levels are not useful. Several levels of evidence strongly indicate diphenhydramine (similar to chlorpheniramine) can block the delayed rectifier potassium channel and, as a consequence, prolong the QT interval, leading to cardiac arrhythmias such as torsades de pointes.
No specific antidote for diphenhydramine toxicity is known, but the anticholinergic syndrome has been treated with physostigmine for severe delirium or tachycardia. Benzodiazepines may be administered to decrease the likelihood of psychosis, agitation, and seizures in people who are prone to these symptoms.

Interactions 

Alcohol may increase the drowsiness caused by diphenhydramine.

Pharmacology

Pharmacodynamics

Diphenhydramine, while traditionally known as an antagonist, acts primarily as an inverse agonist of the histamine H1 receptor. It is a member of the ethanolamine class of antihistaminergic agents. By reversing the effects of histamine on the capillaries, it can reduce the intensity of allergic symptoms. It also crosses the blood–brain barrier and inversely agonizes the H1 receptors centrally. Its effects on central H1 receptors cause drowsiness.

Like many other first-generation antihistamines, diphenhydramine is also a potent antimuscarinic (a competitive antagonist of muscarinic acetylcholine receptors) and, as such, at high doses can cause anticholinergic syndrome. The utility of diphenhydramine as an antiparkinson agent is the result of its blocking properties on the muscarinic acetylcholine receptors in the brain.

Diphenhydramine also acts as an intracellular sodium channel blocker, which is responsible for its actions as a local anesthetic. Diphenhydramine has also been shown to inhibit the reuptake of serotonin. It has been shown to be a potentiator of analgesia induced by morphine, but not by endogenous opioids, in rats. The drug has also been found to act as an inhibitor of histamine N-methyltransferase (HNMT).

Pharmacokinetics 
Oral bioavailability of diphenhydramine is in the range of 40% to 60%, and peak plasma concentration occurs about 2 to 3 hours after administration.

The primary route of metabolism is two successive demethylations of the tertiary amine. The resulting primary amine is further oxidized to the carboxylic acid. Diphenhydramine is metabolized by the cytochrome P450 enzymes CYP2D6, CYP1A2, CYP2C9, and CYP2C19.

The elimination half-life of diphenhydramine has not been fully elucidated, but appears to range between 2.4 and 9.3 hours in healthy adults. A 1985 review of antihistamine pharmacokinetics found that the elimination half-life of diphenhydramine ranged between 3.4 and 9.3 hours across five studies, with a median elimination half-life of 4.3 hours. A subsequent 1990 study found that the elimination half-life of diphenhydramine was 5.4 hours in children, 9.2 hours in young adults, and 13.5 hours in the elderly. A 1998 study found a half-life of 4.1 ± 0.3 hours in young men, 7.4 ± 3.0 hours in elderly men, 4.4 ± 0.3 hours in young women, and 4.9 ± 0.6 hours in elderly women. In a 2018 study in children and adolescents, the half-life of diphenhydramine was 8 to 9 hours.

Chemistry
Diphenhydramine is a diphenylmethane derivative. Analogues of diphenhydramine include orphenadrine, an anticholinergic, nefopam, an analgesic, and tofenacin, an antidepressant.

Detection in body fluids
Diphenhydramine can be quantified in blood, plasma, or serum. Gas chromatography with mass spectrometry (GC-MS) can be used with electron ionization on full scan mode as a screening test. GC-MS or GC-NDP can be used for quantification. Rapid urine drug screens using immunoassays based on the principle of competitive binding may show false-positive methadone results for people having ingested diphenhydramine. Quantification can be used to monitor therapy, confirm a diagnosis of poisoning in people who are hospitalized, provide evidence in an impaired driving arrest, or assist in a death investigation.

History 
Diphenhydramine was discovered in 1943 by George Rieveschl, a former professor at the University of Cincinnati. In 1946, it became the first prescription antihistamine approved by the U.S. FDA.

In the 1960s, diphenhydramine was found to weakly inhibit reuptake of the neurotransmitter serotonin. This discovery led to a search for viable antidepressants with similar structures and fewer side effects, culminating in the invention of fluoxetine (Prozac), a selective serotonin reuptake inhibitor (SSRI). A similar search had previously led to the synthesis of the first SSRI, zimelidine, from brompheniramine, also an antihistamine.

Society and culture 
Diphenhydramine is deemed to have limited abuse potential in the United States owing to its potentially serious side-effect profile and limited euphoric effects, and is not a controlled substance. Since 2002, the U.S. FDA has required special labeling warning against use of multiple products that contain diphenhydramine. In some jurisdictions, diphenhydramine is often present in postmortem specimens collected during investigation of sudden infant deaths; the drug may play a role in these events.

Diphenhydramine is among prohibited and controlled substances in the Republic of Zambia, and travelers are advised not to bring the drug into the country. Several Americans have been detained by the Zambian Drug Enforcement Commission for possession of Benadryl and other over-the-counter medications containing diphenhydramine.

Recreational use
Although diphenhydramine is widely used and generally considered to be safe for occasional usage, multiple cases of abuse and addiction have been documented. Because the drug is cheap and sold over the counter in most countries, adolescents without access to more sought-after, illicit drugs are particularly at risk. People with mental health problems—especially those with schizophrenia—are also prone to abuse the drug, which is self-administered in large doses to treat extrapyramidal symptoms caused by the use of antipsychotics.

Recreational users report calming effects, mild euphoria, and hallucinations as the desired effects of the drug. Research has shown that antimuscarinic agents, including diphenhydramine, "may have antidepressant and mood-elevating properties". A study conducted on adult males with a history of sedative abuse found that subjects who were administered a high dose (400 mg) of diphenhydramine reported a desire to take the drug again, despite also reporting negative effects, such as difficulty concentrating, confusion, tremors, and blurred vision.

In 2020, an Internet challenge emerged on social media platform TikTok involving deliberately overdosing on diphenhydramine; dubbed the Benadryl challenge, the challenge encourages participants to consume dangerous amounts of Benadryl for the purpose of filming the resultant psychoactive effects, and has been implicated in several hospitalisations and at least one death.

Names
Diphenhydramine is marketed under the trade name Benadryl by McNeil Consumer Healthcare in the U.S., Canada, and South Africa. Trade names in other countries include Dimedrol, Daedalon, and Nytol. It is also available as a generic medication.

Procter & Gamble markets an over-the-counter formulation of diphenhydramine as a sleep aid under the brand ZzzQuil. In 2014 this product had annual sales of over $120 million and had a 29.3% share of the $411 million sleep-aid market category.

Other organisms 
Tomatoes (Solanum lycopersicum) have a high uptake of diphenhydramine.

See also 

 Tripelennamine

References

Further reading

External links 

 

5-HT2A antagonists
American inventions
Dimethylamino compounds
Antiemetics
CYP2D6 inhibitors
Deliriants
Enzyme inhibitors
Diphenylmethanol ethers
H1 receptor antagonists
Hypnotics
Local anesthetics
Muscarinic antagonists
Oneirogens
Sedatives
Serotonin reuptake inhibitors
Tertiary amines
Wikipedia medicine articles ready to translate